Ciritei may refer to several places in Romania:

 Ciritei, a village in Trușești Commune, Botoșani County
 Ciritei, a district in the city of Piatra Neamț, Neamț County